In mathematics, moduli of smoothness are used to quantitatively measure smoothness of functions. Moduli of smoothness generalise modulus of continuity and are used in approximation theory and numerical analysis to estimate errors of approximation by polynomials and splines.

Moduli of smoothness

The modulus of smoothness of order  
of a function  is the function  defined by

and

where the finite difference (n-th order forward difference) is defined as

Properties

1. 

2.  is non-decreasing on 

3.  is continuous on 

4. For  we have:

5.  for 

6.
 
If  then 
 
where

Applications

Moduli of smoothness can be used to prove estimates on the error of approximation. Due to property (6), moduli of smoothness provide more general estimates than the estimates in terms of derivatives.

For example, moduli of smoothness are used in Whitney inequality to estimate the error of local polynomial approximation. Another application is given by the following more general version of Jackson inequality:

For every natural number , if  is -periodic continuous function, there exists a trigonometric polynomial  of degree  such that

where the constant  depends on

References

Approximation theory
Numerical analysis